Four Guns to the Border is a 1954 American Western film directed by Richard Carlson and starring Rory Calhoun, Colleen Miller, George Nader, Walter Brennan and Nina Foch. It was produced and distributed by Universal-International Pictures.

Plot
In 1881, a gang of four bandits have their eye on robbing the bank of Cholla, Arizona.  Although several previous attempts by bank robbers have ended in the town cemetery, Cully, the leader, has a plan. 

On the run from their latest dud scheme they tangle with Simon Bhumer and his appealing daughter Lolly. Dutch, one of Cully's gang, recognises Simon as a former gunslinger. Now settled down he is protective father to his motherless daughter just returning from school in Kansas. Young, uninhibited and inexperienced around men Lolly regularly ends rolling around on the ground, tearing her clothing, and getting soaked with water, but she shoots well with a rifle.

The gang move on to their friend and conspirator Greasy's La Tienda general store out in the sticks, and wait for him to turn up from scouting out the town. Later, Simon and Lolly catch up with them there after renegade Apache smoke signals are seen in the hills. In a change to the usual horseplay Lolly becomes a source of attraction for the gang members and indulged with gifts until her father steps in. Cully and Lolly hated each other at first meet, but now each senses something good in the other. Restless at night they experience an instinctive attraction during a desert rainstorm. The group separate, Simon and Lolly towards their farm at Shadow Valley a few miles from the Mexican border, the gang to the bank robbery. Lolly is overwhelmed by a great urge to return to Cully.

Cully's plan is to ride on ahead into his (reveal) old hometown of Cholla, and have it out with his former friend and rival Jim Flannery, now the town sheriff. Flannery  had kicked him out out of town some time before and now has married Maggie, Cully's old girlfriend, who'd hoped she'd seen the last of him. As all the townsfolk watch Cully and Jim beat the living daylights out of each other in a grudge match, the others rob the bank without incident or alarm. Heading for the Mexican border, the gang sees that the Apaches are on the warpath and that Greasy has been killed. At the last waterhole before the border Cully has to choose between being safe and rich in Mexico or rescuing Simon and Lolly from an Apache war party. The posse led by Jim Flannery is not far behind. After a lot of shooting, domesticity triumphs.

Cast
 Rory Calhoun as Cully
 Colleen Miller as Lolly Bhumer
 George Nader as Bronco 
 Walter Brennan as Simon Bhumer
 Nina Foch as Maggie Flannery
 John McIntire as Dutch
 Charles Drake as Sheriff Jim Flannery
 Jay Silverheels as Yaqui
 Nestor Paiva as Greasy
 Mary Field as Mrs. Pritchard
 Robert F. Hoy as Smitty (as Robert Hoy)
 Bob Herron as Evans (as Robert Herron)
 Regis Parton as Cashier (as Reg Parton)
 Donald Kerr as Town Loafer

References

External links
 
 
 

1954 films
Universal Pictures films
1954 Western (genre) films
American Western (genre) films
Films based on short fiction
Films set in the 1880s
Films directed by Richard Carlson
1950s English-language films
1950s American films